The 2007 Philippine Basketball Association (PBA) rookie draft was an event at which teams drafted players from the amateur ranks. The event was held at Market! Market! in Taguig on August 19, 2007. The Welcoat Dragons drafted Joe Devance of the University of Texas at El Paso and Toyota-Balintawak Road Kings to be the #1 draft pick.

Round 1

Round 2 

Red Bull's two picks (supposedly 17th and 19th), and Talk 'N Text (supposedly 18th) were passed.

Draft-day trades 
 Purefoods traded its second-round draft pick to Red Bull.
 Red Bull acquired Mark Andaya from Air21.
 Welcoat traded Junjun Cabatu for Alaska's Nic Belasco.
 Talk 'N Text acquired Yousif Aljamal from Air21.

Undrafted players 
Draftee's name followed by college. All undrafted players become free agents.
 Joel Solis from (Philippine Christian)
 Joferson Gonzales (Mapua)
 Jeff Bombeo from (San Beda)
 Edilgusto Soriano from (San Beda)
 Khiel Misa from (Perpetual Help)
 Chico Manabat from (NU)
 Chris Baluyot (San Sebastian)
 Signed by Air21 Express as a free agent for the 2007-08 PBA season.
 Ronnie Zagala from (FEU)
 Francis Barcellano from (FEU)
 Signed by Talk 'N Text Phone Pals as a free agent for the 2007-08 PBA season.
 Elbert Alberto from (Assumption - Pampanga)
 Jose Aquino (De La Salle)
 Signed by the Barangay Ginebra Kings as a free agent for the 2007-08 PBA season.
 Alex Angeles from (San Beda)
 Reed Juntilla from (UV)
 Signed by Barako Bull Energy Boosters as a free agent for the 2008 PBA Fiesta Conference.
 Frederick Hubalde from (UST)
 Ramil Tagupa from (Adamson)
 Wynsjohn Te from (JRU)
 Mark Legarde from (San Sebastian) / (FEATI)
 Gilbert Neo from (NU)
 James Zablan from (FEU)
 Roberto Rivera
 Kenneth Co Yu Kang from (JRU)
 Rolly Menor from (St. Benilde)
 Tristan Veranga from (Mapua)
 Daryl Pepito from (St. Edward's (Australia))
 Donald Tadena from (Holy Cross - Davao) / (Rizal Tech)
 Dominador Javier from (Perpetual Help)
 Mark Moreno from (U of Mindanao)

Players scrapped from the list 
 Jeff Chan of FEU withdrew his application.

Note 
*All aspirants are Filipinos until proven otherwise.

References

External links 
 PBA.ph

Philippine Basketball Association draft
Draft